McQuade is a surname of Irish origin, from the County Monaghan and other surrounding areas in Ulster. It originated as a variation of McCaul, and similar spellings include McQuaid and McQuaide. Notable people with the surname include:

People 
Aidan McQuade, Northern Irish journalist and anti-slavery advocate
Alex McQuade (born 1992), English footballer
Andy McQuade, British director and writer
Andy McQuade (footballer) (born 1959), Scottish footballer
Arlene McQuade (1936–2014), American actress
Arthur McQuade (1817–1884), Irish-Canadian politician from Ontario
Barbara McQuade (born 1964), American attorney
Betty McQuade (1941–2011), Australian singer
Denis McQuade (born 1951), Scottish footballer
Donald McQuade, English professor and author
Francis Xavier McQuade (1911–1955), American judge
Henry McQuade (1852–1893), Australian politician
Jim McQuade (born 1933), Scottish footballer
John McQuade (disambiguation), multiple people including:
John McQuade (1911–1984), Northern Irish politician and boxer
John McQuade (footballer) (born 1970), Scottish footballer
Johnny McQuade (American football) (1895–1980), American football player
Kris McQuade (born 1952), Australian actress
Marian McQuade (1917–2008), American activist
Marjorie McQuade (born 1934), Australian swimmer
Martin McQuade (1894–1957), Australian rules footballer
Molly McQuade, American poet and editor
Paul McQuade (born 1987), Scottish footballer
Pénélope McQuade (born 1970), Canadian radio and television host
Peter McQuade (born 1948), Scottish footballer
Richard B. McQuade Jr. (born 1940), American attorney and jurist
Terry McQuade (born 1941), English footballer

Characters
J.J. McQuade, Texas Ranger, a character in Lone Wolf McQuade

See also
McCaul
McQuaide
McQuaid
McQuade Home
McQuade Park